Giorgio Bresciani (born 23 April 1969 in Lucca) is an Italian former professional footballer who played as a forward.

References

1969 births
Living people
Italian footballers
Italy under-21 international footballers
Italy youth international footballers
Association football forwards
Serie A players
Serie B players
Serie C players
Torino F.C. players
Atalanta B.C. players
Cagliari Calcio players
S.S.C. Napoli players
A.C. Reggiana 1919 players
Bologna F.C. 1909 players
U.S. Cremonese players
A.C. Ancona players
A.C.N. Siena 1904 players
S.S. Juve Stabia players
A.S.D. Olimpia Colligiana players
A.S.D. Sangiovannese 1927 players